Corridors of Blood (aka Doctor from Seven Dials) is a 1958 British-American period drama film directed by Robert Day and starring Boris Karloff and Christopher Lee. The original music score was composed by Buxton Orr. It was released in England in 1958.

The film was marketed with the tagline "Tops in Terror!" in the US where MGM only released it in 1962 as a double feature with an Italian import called Werewolf in a Girls' Dormitory.

Plot
An 1840s British surgeon, Dr. Thomas Bolton (Boris Karloff) experiments with anesthetic gases in an effort to make surgery pain-free. While doing so, his demonstration before a panel of his peers ends in a horrific mishap with his patient awakening under the knife; he is forced to leave his position in disgrace. To complicate matters, he becomes addicted to the gases and gets involved with a gang of criminals, led by Black Ben (Francis de Wolff) and his henchman Resurrection Joe (Christopher Lee). Unfortunately, this shady partnership leads Bolton to further ruin, culminating in his unwitting participation in murder — for which he becomes the first victim of a blackmail scheme.

Cast

Production
After the success of The Haunted Strangler, producer Richard Gordon looked at making a follow up with Boris Karloff. At one stage a colour remake of Dracula was discussed, as was an adaptation of The Facts in the Case of M. Valdemar. Eventually producer John Scott discovered a screenplay by Jean Scott Rogers based on the early days of anesthesia, originally called Doctor from Seven Dials.

Executive producer Richard Gordon and interviewer Tom Weaver talk about the making of Corridors of Blood on the audio commentary of the Criterion DVD, available as part of the 2007 set Monsters and Madmen.

Release and reception
The movie was made in 1958 but, because of upheavals at MGM at the time, was not released until 1962 on a double feature with an Italian import called Werewolf in a Girls' Dormitory. 
According to MGM records, the film made a profit of $14,000. It was considered a commercial disappointment and was the last film from Amalgamated Productions.

Leonard Maltin awarded the film two and a half out of a possible four stars.

See also
The Haunted Strangler
First Man into Space
The Atomic Submarine

References

External links 

 
 
 
In Praise of Karloff the Uncanny an essay by Maitland McDonagh at the Criterion Collection

1958 films
1950s historical horror films
1958 horror films
British black-and-white films
British historical horror films
1950s crime thriller films
British crime thriller films
Films about surgeons
Films directed by Robert Day
Films set in the 1840s
American black-and-white films
American historical horror films
American crime thriller films
Period horror films
Films shot at MGM-British Studios
1950s English-language films
1950s American films
1950s British films